The Great Hammam of Pristina (/ ) is one of the few Ottoman-era monuments in Pristina, Kosovo. Hammams are also known as Turkish baths. It was built in the 15th century and was part of the Imperial Mosque (Pristina). During the summer and spring, it was used as a meeting place. Considered one of the most important buildings of the cultural and historical heritage, the Great Hammam of Pristina was in poor condition through the years until the approval of its restoration.

The hammam is currently under restoration and it is planned to become the museum of Pristina. The building is owned by the Municipality of Pristina and is under the protection of the Republic of Kosovo. It has been part of the cultural heritage per the decision of the Minister Memli Krasniqi of the Ministry of Culture, Youth and Sport, since October 2012. But, before that the Kosovo War, in 1985 the hammam was considered a protected monument by the law "Protection of the Monument" number 19/77, according to the architect Nol Binakaj. According to him, even though the hammam is different a lot from the original version, only the east part of the building and the main face of the building have been changed. The rest of the building has remained the same. It is a symbol of the old Pristina, together with the Clock Tower, Çarshia Mosque, Academy building, Fatih Mosque and others.

Origin
The Great Hammam of Pristina was built in the second half of the 15th century and it was one of the first Ottoman objects to be built in the Republic of Kosovo. It is known as a part of the Sultan Mehmet Fatih Mosque, named after Mehmed the Conqueror. The hammam was visited by residents of Pristina as a place to meet and socialize for many generations, until the 1970s. or the 1960s according to the architect Nol Binakaj from the Housing Development and Management-Lund University. According to the legend, the builders who were part of the constructions were obliged by Sultan Mehmet al-Fatih to wash themselves in the Hammam, twice a day.

Architecture
The Great Hammam of Pristina is considered as a double hammam, because it has separate sections for men and women. It is approximately 800 m2 and has a quadrant shape. It has both a hot room and a cold room. The hot room has 16 domes, each containing 15 holes. On one of the domes the middle hole is in the shape of either the Star of David or the shape of a regular pentagram. The use of these holes is that the hammam inside could be enlightened. The other use of the holes is to keep the hammam warm. The "hot section" of the hammam, includes the so-called  "baths of the hammam". This room was heated with steam from hypocausts. The hypocausts were under the floor, which was marble.  The building's walls are made of stone, on the other hand the domes are made of bricks and were covered with bad sheets. The interior, however, was plastered with a traditional mortar called "horasan." The "horasan" is known to be resistant to humidity. This building, in general, has regular shaped stones, which are carved in their corners and are linked with lime mortar. For the "cold part"  was known that it was covered by four domes, but no sign of this kind of construction was found. The Great Hammam of Pristina has the entrance hall, middle warm area, main warm area or otherwise known as the massage rooms etc.

Damage through the years
After the building was abandoned, the hammam has undergone renovations several times. The installation of the new water supply and sewage system, without any criteria have resulted in the loss of precious built details, and the building structure was weakened. Even though the hammam's building is one of the oldest Ottoman buildings in Pristina, there has not been any maintenance, since 1989. The building was used only for keeping the construction materials. Three shops were opened in front of the building in 1994. The shops and the eastern part of the building were soon set on fire, in 1995.  According to the European Stability Initiative, the hammam needs protection from the black water. The walls are destroyed from this factor and other factors like time and improper constructions. Not until in April 2007, the Municipality of Pristina decided to do its restoration intermittently.

Restoration 
Because, of these damages the "Parliament of the Municipality of Pristina" in collaboration with the Swedish company CHWB decided to start the hammam's restoration in 2006. They formed a project board, which had members from the municipality of Pristina, CHWB, the faculty of architecture of University of Pristina and the Kosova Council for the Cultural Heritage. The restoration was planned to have three phases of work. The first phase was about cleaning away the litter and earlier construction, and the removal of new walls. It  ended in 2008. The restoration project was financed by CHWB and the restoration was done by a CHWB team, specialists in the restoration of historical monuments, and by a team or board from the municipality of Pristina. The second phase of the restoration's goal was to rebuild the domes, to strengthen the structure of half of the building and consolidate the hammam. This phase lasted from 2009 to 2010 and was financed by CHWB and a Turkish team of experts, "Sida", under the supervision of Zenep Ahunbay. They managed to make a plan about the restoration of the hammam and every single detail was examined and re-examined by the project's board for two years. The final draft of the project was accepted by the project's board in January 2009. In 2009, the municipality of Pristina allocated 300,000 euros for the restoration of the Great Hammam of Pristina. The third phase's goal was restoration and the installation of electricity. A company was chosen by tender by the municipality of Pristina to run the project accepted by the project's board.They started working from 2012. But, with the realization of these three phases, there have been some deviations from the restoration plan, according to the Kosova Council for the Cultural Heritage and CHWB. They said that the company which was chosen has no experience in restoration of monuments at all. The installation of electricity was destroying the original masonry. The materials chosen for the restoration of the hammam were completely improper for a restoration and the monument is deeply endangered by the atmospheric waters, which is further weakening the structure of the monument. Ottoman artifacts found in the monument were not treated properly. This company was making irreversible changes and the historic details of the hammam were being lost. CHWB warned the municipality of Pristina and the Kosova Council for the Cultural Heritage to disengage the contract made with the company chosen for restoration. They said that, if the municipality of Pristina didn't do what was included in the project, they would withdraw from the cooperation with the municipality of Pristina. With the request of CHWB and the Kosova Council for the Cultural Heritage, the Ministry of Culture,Youth and Sports ordered that the restoration of the Great Hammam of Pristina to be discontinued on 07.02.2013. According to Top Channel, the hammam is currently under restoration with the decision of the "Ministry of Culture, Youth and Sports".

Installation art 
In an attempt to use neglected sites in Pristina as art exhibition spaces for Manifesta 14, Japanese installation artist Chiharu Shiota hung hundreds of red threads of yarn from the Great Hammam’s ceiling. The venue counted over 150,000 visitors.

See also
 Pristina
 Religion in Kosovo
 Islam in Kosovo
 Tourism in Kosovo

Notes

References

Buildings and structures completed in the 15th century
Buildings and structures in Pristina
Ottoman baths in Kosovo
Tourist attractions in Pristina
Kosovo vilayet
15th-century establishments in the Ottoman Empire
Cultural heritage of Kosovo